Dioscorea villosa is a species of twining tuberous vine which is native to eastern North America. It is commonly known as wild yam, colic root, rheumatism root, devil's bones, and fourleaf yam,. It is common and widespread in a range stretching from Texas and Florida north to Minnesota, Ontario and Massachusetts.

Description 

Dioscorea villosa flower petal color is commonly known to be green to brown, or white. Lengths of the flower petals range from .5 mm to 2 mm. The flowers tend to grow out of the axil; this is the point at which a branch or leaf attaches to the main stem. There is only one flower present on the inflorescence. The fruit of the plant is a capsule that splits and releases the seeds within to then begin the dispersal process The fruit of Dioscorea villosa ranges in size from 10–30 mm. The flower does not produce aerial bulblets.

Taxonomy 
Synonyms of Wild Yam, Dioscorea villosa include: Dioscorea hirticaulis, Dioscorea villosa var. hirticaulis. Common names of Dioscorea villosa include wild yam, Atlantic yam, common wild yam, wild yam-root, yellow yam; colic root, rheumatism root

Chemistry 

Dioscorea villosa contains diosgenin, which despite claims is not a phytoestrogen and does not interact with estrogen receptors. Other steroidal saponins are also found in the plant.

Medical use 

Some of the English common names of this plant reflect its use in Native American and other traditional medicines. In traditional Russian herbal medicine, saponin extracts from the roots of various varieties of wild yam are thought to be an anticoagulant, antisclerotic, antispasmodic, cholagogue, depurative, diaphoretic, diuretic and a vasodilator.

There is little modern clinical research on Dioscorea villosa, and the one study of a wild yam-containing cream for menopausal symptoms failed to find any value from this therapy. According to the American Cancer Society, there is no evidence to support wild yam or diosgenin being either safe or effective in humans.

References

Further reading
http://www.nlm.nih.gov/medlineplus/druginfo/natural/970.html
Eagon PK, Elm MS, Hunter DS, et al. Medicinal herbs: modulation of estrogen action. Era of Hope Mtg, Dept Defense; Breast Cancer Res Prog, Atlanta, GA 2000;Jun 8-11.

External links

villosa
Flora of the Eastern United States
Flora of Ontario
Plants described in 1753
Taxa named by Carl Linnaeus
Flora without expected TNC conservation status